Paula Joan Caplan (July 7, 1947 – July 21, 2021) was an American psychologist, activist, writer, and artist. She was an associate at Harvard University's DuBois Institute, director of the Voices of Diversity Project, and a past Fellow at the Women and Public Policy Program of the John F. Kennedy School of Government at Harvard. Previously she had been full professor of psychology, assistant professor of psychiatry, and lecturer in Women's Studies at the University of Toronto, as well as head of the Centre for Women's Studies in Education there, and was chosen by the American Psychological Association as an "eminent woman psychologist". She also taught at Harvard University, Connecticut College, and the University of Rhode Island, gave hundreds of invited addresses, and did more than 1,000 media interviews about social issues. She was the author of The Myth of Women's Masochism, Don't Blame Mother, and a number of other books. Her twelfth and final book was When Johnny and Jane Come Marching Home: How All of Us Can Help Veterans, which won the 2011 American Publishers Award for Professional and Scholarly Excellence in the Psychology category.

Since the 1980s, Caplan was concerned that psychiatric diagnoses are unscientific, that giving someone a psychiatric label does not reduce their suffering, and that labeling them carries enormous risks of harm. Caplan outwardly addressed her concerns to the public. In her book, They Say You’re Crazy: How the Worlds most Powerful Psychiatrists Decide Who’s Normal, Caplan discusses the nature of diagnosis and how the DSM contributes to the unique faults of psychiatry. She sought to educate the public about the unregulated nature of psychiatric diagnoses and the consequent lack of recourse for people who have been harmed by getting such labels, including how getting a psychiatric diagnosis and label often may stand in the way of recovery.

Paula Caplan died on July 21, 2021, in Rockville, Maryland.

Career

Author 
Caplan authored tweleve books.

When Johnny and Jane Come Marching Home: How All of Us Can Help Veterans

See also
James Gottstein
David Oaks
Elyn Saks

References

External links
Paula Joan Caplan Official Site
In Memoriam: Paula Joan Caplan
Ending Harm from Psychiatric Diagnosis
The Welcome Johnny and Jane Home Project
Papers of Paula J. Caplan, 1973-2006. Schlesinger Library, Radcliffe Institute, Harvard University.

1947 births
2021 deaths
Duke University alumni
American women psychologists
Psychiatric assessment
Radcliffe College alumni
People from Springfield, Missouri
21st-century American non-fiction writers
21st-century American women